Thirumathi Margaret Elisabeth Felix (born 1937) is an Indian educator active in the state of Tamil Nadu. She has served at least two terms in the Tamil Nadu Legislative Assembly: Sixth (1977–80) and Seventh (1980–84) as a nominated member belonging to the Anglo-Indian community.

Early life
Born in Tamil Nadu (then Madras State) on 27 January 1937, Thirumathi Margaret Elisabeth attended the Doveton Corrie Girls' High School. She received her Master of Arts degree from Queen Mary's College, Chennai and did her Teachers' Training course from St. Christopher Training College, Chennai.

Career
Felix has been a member of the state education board of Tamil Nadu and chairperson of the managing committee for C.S.I. Ewart Matriculation Higher Secondary School. She has also been the headmistress of Doveton Corrie Girls' High School.

In 1977, she was nominated to the Sixth Assembly of Tamil Nadu for a seat reserved for Anglo-Indian members. She continued her term in the next assembly (1980–84) too.

Personal life
Felix married Clement Felix, a well known teacher and headmaster who received a National Award in recognition of his contributions to the field of education in 1991.

References

1937 births
Living people